Settegast is a surname. Notable people with the surname include: 

Hermann Settegast (1819–1908), German agronomist
Joseph Anton Settegast (1813–1890), German church painter
Mary Settegast (1934–2020), American scholar and author